Teglværksbroen is a bascule bridge which connects Sluseholmen to Teglholmen in the South Harbour of Copenhagen, Denmark. It crosses the entrance to the Teglværkshavnen (em. Tileworks Dock) from which it takes its name.

History
The need for the bridge arose when the Sluseholmen and Teglholmen areas came under redevelopment. Its design was the subject of an architectural competition which was won by Hvidt & Mølgaard in 2008. The leaf was manufactured in one 20 by 20 metres piece in Gdańsk, Poland, and installed on the site in January 2011.

Design
The bridge is built to a simple design which heralds that of the older bridges in the Port of Copenhagen. The most distinctive feature of the bridge is two simple and light twin triangles which are illuminated from below at night.

References

External links
 Teglværksbroen on Copenhagen X

Bridges in Copenhagen
Bascule bridges
Road bridges in Denmark
Bridges completed in 2011
2011 establishments in Denmark